Chloe Bruce is a fictional character from the British Channel 4 soap opera Hollyoaks, played by Mikyla Dodd. The character first appeared onscreen in 2000. The character is noted for her storylines involving self-image issues and acting as the "agony aunt" within the serial.

Character creation
Auditions were held for the part. Actress Mikyla Dodd was member of Oldham Theatre Workshop under the tuition of David Johnson and through that she got an agent, who managed to get her the audition. Chloe was described as a seventeen-year-old at the audition and Dodd felt she was too old and would lose out to a younger actress, however she impressed Jo Hallow, when she returned home from the audition she found out she had secured the role.
In 2004 it was announced that Dodd had decided to leave Hollyoaks. Speaking of Dodd's departure, a Channel 4 spokesperson stated: "The cast were really sad to see her go, she became very much like her character and was always there for people. Mikyla became a bit of an agony aunt for the rest of the cast."

Character development
Dodd has commented that she liked the fact her character looked a little bit different to everyone else on the show. She also stated that her character always seems to be there for everyone, somewhat of an agony aunt. The character had plenty of self-image issues. Dodd also states numerous times that she is known as "the fat girl from Hollyoaks". Her character has also been described as 'breaking the mould' as the first plus-size character to feature in the series. In 2009, five years after the character had left the series, a BBC health organisation slammed Dodd for using her character as a role model in making overweight viewers think it's okay to be overweight.

In the serial she was dubbed 'Chloe "the moose" Bruce'. She formed a close friendship with Max Cunningham (Matt Littler) and Sam "O.B." O'Brien (Darren Jeffries) which saw her on the trail of money making scams. Dodd later stated that ultimately Matt Musgrove (Kristian Ealey) is the love of Chloe's life.

Storylines
Chloe arrived in Hollyoaks in late night special series Hollyoaks: Breaking Boundaries, as a school friend of Max and O.B., she soon proved her worth when she relieved them both of their virginity. They formed a close threesome, with the boys often enlisting Chloe to help them with money making schemes playing Mother Christmas when they started their own grotto. Chloe came into her own when she started at Hollyoaks Community College and became friends with the other students.

She moved into Tony’s house and after a one-night stand with Alex Bell (Martino Lazzeri), but soon found happiness with assistant caretaker Matt. For a time the relationship looked blissful, yet it went sour when Chloe began to have problems with her weight and self-perception and they split up. Chloe tried to come to terms with her problems and attempting to find the Chloe that she is comfortable being.

However, soon Matt and Chloe got back together after the pair admitted they still loved each other. Matt proposed to Chloe and she agreed to marry him. Chloe had felt that Matt was her man as he was kind, gentle and forgiving, but she did not know was of his dodgy deals with Scott Anderson (Daniel Hyde). During her wedding day, Chloe was shocked when Tony accused her of giving him counterfeit money for the catering. The matter had got even more serious as Matt waited at the altar, Chloe arrived and shocked everyone when she told Matt that she could not go ahead with the wedding after discovering that the money came from him with Scott's dealings. Despite all this, Chloe still loved Matt but decided to move on from Hollyoaks by cashing in on the honeymoon tickets and going travelling with Izzy Cornwell (Elize du Toit).

Two months later, Chloe returned and was a more relaxed person as she helped Max, Becca Hayton (Ali Bastian), Ben Davies (Marcus Patric), Izzy, OB and many other characters of the show to get over their problems. She found herself being Student Union Advisor as she opened a Student bar. However, Chloe got the unexpected a job at Capital Radio, a job meaning she had to move to London. Ex fiancé, Matt returned asking her to get back with him. Chloe had two options and decided that her destiny is to take the job and start a new chapter in her life away from Hollyoaks.

References

Hollyoaks characters
Television characters introduced in 2000
Female characters in television
Fictional radio personalities